The Rwanda Revenue Authority (RRA) is a government revenue collection agency established by the Parliament of Rwanda. The RRA is charged with enforcing, assessing, collecting, and accounting for the various taxes imposed in Rwanda.

Location
The headquarters of RRA are located at Rwanda Revenue Authority House, located in the neighborhood of Kimiruhura, in the capital city of Kigali. RRA maintains other offices in the country. The coordinates of the headquarters of the organization are:01°57'10.0"S, 30°05'05.0"E (Latitude:-1.952778; Longitude:30.084722).

Overview
The law that created the Rwanda Revenue Authority was passed by the Rwandan Parliament in 1997, but the agency became operational in 1998. RRA is supervised by the Rwanda Ministry of Finance and Economic Planning.

RRA started in 1998, with 200 employees who needed training and equipping with skills and technology to perform their duties. An organisational structure had to be established and streamlined into departments and a coherent chain of command. As of May 2017 the tax body was expected to collect at least RWF:1 trillion (approx. US$1,215,000,000), for the first time in the financial year ending in June 2017. At that time, the agency maintained 168,346 taxpayers.

Non compliance by large corporate clients, and the sourcing and retention of qualified experienced staff, remain challenges for the tax agency.

Administration
The chief executive officer of the organization is the Commissioner General, currently Pascal Bizimana Ruganintwali, appointed by the President of Rwanda, with the consent of the Senate, for a term of five years, renewable once. The Commissioner General is assisted by a Deputy Commissioner General.

The agency has two service departments, each headed by a commissioner: (1) the Customs Services Department and (2) the Domestic Taxes Department.

There are eleven supportive departments, each headed by either a commissioner or a deputy commissioner: (1) Revenue Investigation & Enforcement Department (2) Quality Assurance Department (3) Taxpayer Services Department (4) Planning and Research Department (5) Legal and Board Secretariat Department (6) Human Resource Department (7) Information Technology Department (8) Finance Department (9) Training Department
(10) Corporate Risk Management & Modernization Department (11) Administration and Logistics Department.

See also
 Economy of Rwanda

References

External links
 Website of Rwanda Revenue Authority
 A guide to taxation in Rwanda (2015), by PricewaterhouseCoopers

Government of Rwanda
Economy of Rwanda
Taxation in Rwanda
Revenue services
Organizations established in 1998
1998 establishments in Rwanda
Kigali